Selvasaura is a genus of the lizard family Gymnophthalmidae. The genus contains three species.

Species 
Selvasaura almendarizae  - Almendáriz's microtegu
Selvasaura brava  - brave forest microtegu
Selvasaura evasa  - elusive microtegu

References

Selvasaura